The First А Women's Basketball League of Montenegro is the highest women's professional club basketball competition in Montenegro. It was founded in 2006 after the dissolution of Serbia and Montenegro.

History

Before independence
Since 2006, Montenegrin women's basketball clubs played in the league system of SFR Yugoslavia, FR Yugoslavia and Serbia and Montenegro. Teams as ŽKK Budućnost, ŽKK Roling, ŽKK Primorje and ŽKK Jedinstvo played in the First League of FR Yugoslavia/Serbia and Montenegro.

Most successful was ŽKK Budućnost, the only Montenegrin women's basketball club who won national trophy in Yugoslav League. First time, Budućnost won the championship at season 2001–02, after defeated ŽKK Hemofarm in playoff final series (3:2). Next year, Budućnost defended the trophy against ŽKK Vršac.
Below is the list of Montenegrin clubs' champion titles in the First League of Yugoslavia.

After independence
Soon after the Montenegrin independence referendum, Basketball Federation of Montenegro founded its own competitions, with the First A League as a top-tier women's league.
ŽKK Budućnost won first two seasons, but after that dominated ŽKK Jedinstvo with three consecutive trophies won. In period 2012-2019, all champion titles won ŽKK Budućnost.
Montenegrin clubs are playing in regional WABA league since its founding. Most successes had ŽKK Budućnost, who won the competition on seasons 2015-16, 2017-18 and 2019-20.

Champions 
From the inaugural season (2006/07), two clubs won the champion titles in Montenegrin Basketball League. ŽKK Budućnost had 10 titles, and ŽKK Jedinstvo three.

Titles by season

Titles by Club

Montenegrin League 
Below is a list of clubs with titles won in Montenegrin Basketball League.

Overall 
Below is an overall list, with titles won in both leagues - Montenegrin Basketball League and FR Yugoslavia / Serbia and Montenegro Championship.

Placements by season
Since establishing, in Montenegrin basketball league participated 13 different teams. Only ŽKK Budućnost played all the seasons in the highest tier competition.

07 = season 2006/07

Montenegrin women's basketball clubs in Regional League's

WABA League
Women Adriatic Basketball League, or WABA League is founded at 2001, and Montenegrin clubs are part of it since 2004. Most successful Montenegrin representatives in WABA League were ŽKK Budućnost Podgorica and ŽKK Jedinstvo Bijelo Polje. While ŽKK Budućnost won three champion titles (2015–16, 2017–18, 2019–20), ŽKK Jedinstvo finished one season as a finalist in playoffs.
Below is list of participation of Montenegrin clubs by every season of WABA League.

Montenegrin women's basketball clubs in European competitions

Women's basketball clubs from Montenegro participated in FIBA competitions since the start of century. Clubs which played in European Cups until today are ŽKK Budućnost Podgorica and ŽKK Jedinstvo Bijelo Polje.
ŽKK Budućnost played in EuroLeague Women during the one season, but finished it after the group phase.

As of the end of FIBA competitions 2015–16 season.

See also
 Montenegrin Women's Basketball Cup
 Montenegrin Basketball League

External links
 Profile at eurobasket.com

References

Montenegro
Basketball leagues in Montenegro
Sports leagues established in 2006
League
2006 establishments in Montenegro